GenMAPP (Gene Map Annotator and Pathway Profiler) is a free, open-source bioinformatics software tool designed to visualize and analyze genomic data in the context of pathways (metabolic, signaling), connecting gene-level datasets to biological processes and disease.  First created in 2000, GenMAPP is developed by an open-source team based in an academic research laboratory. GenMAPP maintains databases of gene identifiers and collections of pathway maps in addition to visualization and analysis tools.  Together with other public resources, GenMAPP aims to provide the research community with tools to gain insight into biology through the integration of data types ranging from genes to proteins to pathways to disease.

History

GenMAPP was first created in 2000 as a prototype software tool in the laboratory of Bruce Conklin at the J. David Gladstone Institutes in San Francisco and continues to be developed in the same non-profit, academic research environment. The first release version of GenMAPP 1.0 was available in 2002, supporting analysis of DNA microarray data from human, mouse, rat and yeast. In 2004, GenMAPP 2.0 was released, combining the previously accessory programs MAPPFinder and MAPPBuilder, and expanding support to additional species. GenMAPP 2.1 was released in 2006 with new visualization features and support for a total of eleven species.

Usage

GenMAPP was developed by biologists and is focused on pathway visualization for bench biologists. Unlike many other computational systems biology tools, GenMAPP is not designed for cell/systems modeling; it focuses on the immediate needs of bench biologists by enabling them to rapidly interpret genomic data with an intuitive, easy-to-use interface.
GenMAPP is implemented in Visual Basic 6.0 and is available as a stand-alone application for Microsoft Windows operating systems, including Boot Camp or Parallels Workstation on a Mac.

Content and Features

GenMAPP builds and maintains gene databases for a variety of key model organisms:

 human - Homo sapiens
 mouse - Mus musculus
 rat - Rattus norvegicus
 yeast - Saccharomyces cerevisiae
 zebrafish - Danio rerio
 worm - Caenorhabditis elegans
 fruit fly - Drosophila melanogaster
 dog - Canis familiaris
 cow - Bos taurus
 mosquito - Anopheles gambiae
 E.coli - Escherichia coli

GenMAPP provides tools to create, edit and annotate biological pathway maps.

GenMAPP allows users to visualize and analyze their data in the context of pathway collections and the Gene Ontology.

See also 

 WikiPathways
 Cytoscape
 Ensembl
 KEGG
 Netpath
 Reactome
 Gene Ontology

References

External links
 
 GenMAPP – Data Links
 Cytoscape
 PathVisio
 WikiPathways
 

Bioinformatics software
Free science software
Systems biology
Windows-only free software